Wo Hang is an area and a valley in Sha Tau Kok, in the North District of Hong Kong.

History
Wo Hang was served by the Wo Hang station of the former Sha Tau Kok Railway, which was in operation from 1911 to 1928. Wo Hang station was opened on 21 December 1911.

Features
Several villages are located in the area, including:
 Ha Wo Hang
 Sheung Wo Hang, known as 'Wo Hang' until the 18th century
 Wo Hang Tai Long

References

Sha Tau Kok
Areas of Hong Kong